Anton Sergeevich Kuksin (born 3 July 1995) is a Kazakhstani footballer who plays as a right-back for FC Okzhetpes.

Career

Kuksin started his career with Kazakhstani top flight side Okzhetpes, where he made 95 league appearances and scored 4 goals.

Before the 2019 season, he signed for Akzhayik in the Kazakhstani second division.

In 2020, Kuksin signed for Russian club Tyumen after almost signing for SC Verl in Germany and receiving interest from Estonia.

References

External links
 
 

Living people
1995 births
Kazakhstani footballers
Association football defenders
Kazakhstani expatriate footballers
Sportspeople from Kokshetau
FC Okzhetpes players
FC Akzhayik players
FC Tyumen players
FC Irtysh Omsk players
Russian Second League players
Kazakhstan Premier League players
Kazakhstani expatriate sportspeople in Russia
Expatriate footballers in Russia